The S7 district lies within in the City of Sheffield, South Yorkshire, England.  The district contains 16 listed buildings that are recorded in the National Heritage List for England.  Of these, one is listed at Grade I, the highest of the three grades, two are at Grade II*, the middle grade, and the others are at Grade II, the lowest grade.  The district is in the north west of the city of Sheffield, and covers parts of the areas of Carter Knowle, Millhouses, Nether Edge and Sharrow.

For neighbouring areas, see listed buildings in S2, listed buildings in S8, listed buildings in S11 and listed buildings in S17.



Key

Buildings

References 

 - A list of all the listed buildings within Sheffield City Council's boundary is available to download from this page.
Images of England

Sources

 
Sheffield